Goeres Park is a public park in Lodi, Wisconsin, United States. The park was established in 1935, when the village bought  of land for a new park and water plant. T.C. Goeres, president of the Lodi Canning Company and the park's namesake, developed the park, while Franz A. Aust, a professor of landscape architecture at the University of Wisconsin, designed it. The park is divided by Spring Creek, which is bordered by a sandstone rip-rap. Historic features in the park include a memorial to Goeres' son Robert M. Goeres and a stone fountain dedicated to Dr. E. Velna Chala. The park was added to the National Register of Historic Places on April 9, 2009.

References

Buildings and structures in Columbia County, Wisconsin
Parks on the National Register of Historic Places in Wisconsin
Prairie School architecture in Wisconsin
Lodi, Wisconsin
National Register of Historic Places in Columbia County, Wisconsin